Thomas Hart Benton (5 September 1815 – 10 April 1879) was an American politician.

Born on 5 September 1815 in Williamson County, Tennessee, Thomas Hart Benton was named after his uncle, who served in the Tennessee Senate, and represented Missouri on the United States Senate and House of Representatives. The younger T. H. Benton attended Huntington Academy and Marion College in Missouri. In 1839, Benton moved to Dubuque, Iowa, and found work as a teacher. After ending his teaching career, he became a merchant.

Politically, Benton was affiliated with the Democratic Party. He was elected to the Iowa Senate from District 17, and served as a member of the First Iowa General Assembly from 30 November 1846 to 3 December 1848. He stepped down from the state senate to serve six years as Iowa's first Superintendent of Public Instruction. At the time, that office was held concurrently with the position of secretary of the Iowa Board of Regents.

Later, Benton moved to Council Bluffs. As the American Civil War broke out, Governor Samuel J. Kirkwood granted Benton the military rank of colonel and tasked him with organizing the 29th Iowa Infantry Regiment. Following the Battle of Bayou Fourche, the 29th Iowa, under Benton's command, protected the home of Confederate general Albert Pike. Benton completed this task because both he and Pike were Freemasons. Benton was elevated to the rank of brevet brigadier-general and returned to Iowa after the war ended. Benton contested the 1865 Iowa gubernatorial election as a Democratic candidate opposed to African-American suffrage, and lost to Republican incumbent William M. Stone. After Andrew Johnson assumed the presidency following the assassination of Abraham Lincoln, the Republican Assessor of Internal Revenue was removed from office, and Benton took on the position. Benton died in St. Louis, Missouri, on 10 April 1879.

References

People of Iowa in the American Civil War
Union Army generals
People from Williamson County, Tennessee
American Freemasons
Andrew Johnson administration personnel
Politicians from Council Bluffs, Iowa
19th-century American politicians
19th-century American educators
Iowa Superintendents of Public Instruction
1815 births
Politicians from Dubuque, Iowa
Democratic Party Iowa state senators
1879 deaths